VCC  may refer to:

Organizations

Companies
 ValueVision Channel, the previous name of ShopNBC
 Velsicol Chemical Corporation, Illinois, US
 Volvo Car Corporation, a Swedish automobile manufacturer

Colleges
 Vale of Catmose College, an arts college in England
 Valencia Community College, in Orlando, Florida
 Valor Christian College, in Columbus, Ohio
 Vancouver Career College, in British Columbia, Canada
 Vancouver Community College, a vocational training institute in Vancouver, British Columbia, Canada
 Vista Community College, in California

Other organizations
 Vaccine Choice Canada, an anti-vaccination organization
 Vancouver Chamber Choir, in Vancouver, British Columbia, Canada
 Ventura County Council, a Boy Scouts of America local council in California, US
 Veteran Car Club of Great Britain, a vintage motor racing club in England
 Vineyard Church of Columbus, in Ohio, US
 Virginia Community Corps, an AmeriCorps state program in Virginia, US
 Volunteer Cadet Corps, the Royal Naval Cadets and Royal Marines Cadets of the UK's Royal Navy

Science and technology
 Voltage common collector (VCC), an IC power-supply pin and collector supply line voltage in an NPN circuit
 Virtual credit card, a virtual credit card number typically used for online purchases
 Voice call continuity, a specification for mobile phone service
 Video Compact Cassette, an early name for Philips' Video 2000 videocassette format
 Virtual collective consciousness, in behavioral science
 Virtual colony count, an antibacterial assay
 Vehicle Control Center, a SelTrac rail signalling system from Thales Rail Signalling Solutions

Other uses
 Vancouver Convention Centre, a convention centre in Vancouver, British Columbia, Canada
 Viewer's Choice Canada, a video on-demand service
 Virtual Credit Card, a credit card number issued most often for single transactions
 Vocational Competence Certificate, a system of education and certification
 Volvo Cross Country (disambiguation), several vehicles sold by AB Volvo
 Voorburg Cricket Club, in Voorburg, the Netherlands